The Ministry of Culture, Gender, Entertainment and Sport is a ministry of the Government of Jamaica. The minister since the 2016 election has been Olivia Grange. 

Predecessors of the current ministry include the Ministry of Culture and the Ministry of Sports, Youth and Culture; the youth remit from the latter title is now under the Ministry of Education, Youth and Information.

The ministry includes the following agencies:
Jamaica Cultural Development Commission
Women's Centre of Jamaica Foundation
Jamaica Anti-Doping Commission
The Institute of Jamaica
Jamaica National Heritage Trust
National Library of Jamaica
Sports Development Foundation

References

External links
 

Ministries and agencies of the government of Jamaica
Jamaica
Jamaica
Jamaica
Women's rights in Jamaica